Reid Petty (born May 14, 1985) is an American politician who served in the Kansas House of Representatives as a Republican for one term in 2013 and 2014. Petty challenged incumbent Republican Carl Holmes in the 2012 primary election; Petty won by only 9 votes, taking 904 ballots (50.2%) to Holmes' 895 (49.7%). The general election was not contested, and Petty took office in January of 2013. He served for only one term, declining to run for re-election in 2014, and was succeeded by fellow Republican Shannon Francis.

References

Living people
1985 births
Republican Party members of the Kansas House of Representatives
21st-century American politicians
People from Liberal, Kansas